The Aion LX is a mid-size electric crossover SUV produced by Aion, a marque of Guangzhou Automobile Corporation. It was revealed at Auto Shanghai in April 2019.

History

The Aion LX was unveiled at Auto Shanghai in April 2019. The LX started pre-sale in August 2019 and production in October 2019.

It is the second vehicle sold under the GAC New Energy Aion sub-brand after the Aion S.

Aion LX Fuel Cell
On 28 July 2020 at the GAC Tech Day event, GAC presented a fuel cell version of the Aion LX with a different grille from that of the electric version for hydrogen technology testing purposes. The Aion LX Fuel Cell has a fueling time of 3–5 minutes and a NEDC range exceeding .

Aion LX Plus

Unveiled in November 2021, the Aion LX Plus is an updated variant of the all-electric Aion LX which is slightly longer, features a different styling (taking design cues from the smaller Aion V Plus) and is equipped with a  battery. The battery uses silicon sponge technology in its anode.

Specifications

Features
The Aion LX's roof has solar panels that are used to heat and cool the interior. Unmanned parking and level 4 autonomous driving is also featured in the LX. Front passenger seat can be automatically moved forwards from the rear control panel similar to Mercedes S-Class. The rear seats have fold out leg supports.

Exterior
The Aion LX's exterior uses the same design cues as the Aion S and V, with the same front and headlight design and rear taillight bar. Gloss black aerodynamic wheel covers, carbon wing mirrors and carbon C-pillar can be optioned.

Sales

Hycan 007

In April 2019, GAC and Nio announced they would form a joint venture electric vehicle brand called Hycan.

The Hycan 007 is a mid-size electric Sport utility vehicle produced since April 2020.

On 20 May 2019, Hycan revealed the 007 concept, an Aion LX (produced by GAC New Energy) with a redesigned front and rear end, interior, and wheel design. The production model was yet to be revealed and multiple teasers were shown before the upcoming revealing.

On 27 December 2019, the largely unchanged production Hycan 007 was revealed and went on pre-sale before being officially listed for sale in the Chinese market in April 2020 at a starting price of 262,000 Chinese yuan (37,343 USD).

The 007 is available in three trim levels, Base, Plus, and Top.

See also

 Aion S, a compact executive electric sedan by Aion
 List of GAC vehicles

References

GAC Group
LX
2010s cars
Cars introduced in 2019
Cars of China
Production electric cars